The Art Institutes International Minnesota was a for-profit college in Minneapolis, Minnesota. It was part of The Art Institutes, a system of proprietary colleges focusing on creative industries.   The Art Institutes International Minnesota offered certificate, associate, and bachelor's degrees and at one time had an enrollment of over 2,000 students. On June 10, 2016, it was announced that the school would stop enrolling students into its programs effective immediately.  It will close its doors in three years when the final class graduates.

History
Located in downtown Minneapolis, The Art Institutes International Minnesota prepares students for careers in the visual and practical arts. The Art Institutes International Minnesota was founded in 1964 by Petrena Lowthian establishing what was to become Lowthien College.

In 1981, Lowthian College was authorized to award the Associate in Applied Science degree. The Art Institutes acquired the College in early 1997.

Former presidents include:
 1997 – 2001: Glenn Johannesen
 2002-2004: Dr. Alan Stutts
 2004-2006: Larry Horn
 2006-2008: Joseph Marzano
 2008-2010: William A. Johnson
 2010 – 2012: Dr. Jeffrey Allen

References 

Art schools in Minnesota
Culture of Minneapolis
Universities and colleges in Minneapolis
Minnesota
Educational institutions established in 1964
1964 establishments in Minnesota
Educational institutions disestablished in 2019